Brenthia pavonacella, the peacock brenthia moth, is a moth of the family Choreutidae. It is found in North America, including Illinois, Maryland, Iowa, Oklahoma and South Carolina. It has also been recorded from Mexico.

The wingspan is about 9 mm. There are at least two generations per year in Illinois.

The larvae feed on the underside of the leaflets of Desmodium species. They skeletonise the leaves of their host plant. In its early instars, the larva causes damage that somewhat resembles feeding damage of some Cicadellidae species. Later instars eat large patches of the leaf area, so that only the leaf veins remain intact. They cut a small escape hole completely through the host leaf, which it uses to quickly move to the opposite side of the leaf when disturbed. Larvae can be found from early July to early September.

References

External links
mothphotographersgroup
Bug Guide

Brenthia